Tinker Bell is a fictional character from J. M. Barrie's 1904 play Peter Pan and its 1911 novelisation Peter and Wendy. She has appeared in a variety of film and television adaptations of the Peter Pan stories, in particular the 1953 animated Walt Disney picture Peter Pan. She also appears in the official 2006 sequel Peter Pan in Scarlet by Geraldine McCaughrean commissioned by Great Ormond Street Hospital as well as the "Peter and the Starcatchers" book series by Ridley Pearson and Dave Barry.

At first only a supporting character described by her creator as "a common fairy", her animated incarnation was a hit and has since become a widely recognized unofficial mascot of The Walt Disney Company, next to the Walt Disney company's official mascot Mickey Mouse, and the centrepiece of its Disney Fairies media franchise including the direct-to-DVD film series Tinker Bell and Walt Disney's Wonderful World of Color.

In original play and novel
Barrie described Tinker Bell as a fairy who mended pots and kettles, an actual tinker of the fairy folk. Her speech consists of the sounds of a tinkling bell, which is understandable only to those familiar with the language of the fairies.

Though sometimes ill-tempered, jealous, vindictive and inquisitive, she is also helpful and kind to Peter. The extremes in her personality are explained in the story by the fact that a fairy's size prevents her from holding more than one feeling at a time, so when she is angry she has no counterbalancing compassion. At the end of the novel, when Peter flies back to find an older Wendy, it is mentioned that Tinker Bell died in the year after Wendy and her brothers left Neverland, and Peter no longer remembers her.

In the first draft of the play, she is called Tippy-toe, but became Tinker Bell in the later drafts and final version.

On stage
In the original stage productions, Tinker Bell was represented on stage by a darting light "created by a small mirror held in the hand off-stage and reflecting a little circle of light from a powerful lamp" and her voice was "a collar of bells and two special ones that Barrie brought from Switzerland". However, a 'Jane (or Jenny) Wren' was listed among the cast on the programmes as playing Tinker Bell; this was a joke which also helped with the mystique of the fairy character, and fooled H.M. Inspector of Taxes, who sent Jane Wren a tax demand.

Originally, no fairy dust was mentioned in the play but Barrie added to the script the necessity to sprinkle it to enable the children to fly because "so many children tried [to fly] from their beds and needed surgical attention."

In the  musical version of the play, she was also represented by a darting light, accompanied by a celesta. Her favourite insult (as in Barrie's play) is "You silly ass!", which the audience learns to recognise because it is always represented by the same motif: four notes (presumably one for each syllable of the phrase), followed by a growl on the bassoon.

In film
Film adaptations provided the first vocal effects for the character, whether through sound, such as musical expressions or the sound of a tinkling bell, or human speech.

Peter Pan (1924)
In the 1924 film, Tinker Bell was played by Virginia Browne Faire.

Peter Pan (1953) and other Disney media

In Walt Disney's 1953 film version of Peter Pan, the character is blonde, wears a green dress and white slippers. She doesn't speak but as in the original play, Peter verbally interprets her communications for the sake of the audience, and bell noises are used when she makes gestures.

Tinker Bell has become one of Disney's most important branding icons for over half a century along with Jiminy Cricket, and Mickey Mouse, and is generally known as "a symbol of 'the magic of Disney'". She has been featured in television commercials and show opening credits sprinkling pixie dust with a wand in order to shower a magical feeling over various other Disney personalities, though the 1953 animated version of Tinker Bell never actually used a wand. In the picture and the official Disney Character Archives, she is referred to as a pixie.

There is a myth that the original animated version of Tinker Bell was modelled after Marilyn Monroe. However, Disney animator Marc Davis's primary reference was actress Margaret Kerry. He illustrated Tinker Bell as an attractive, blonde blue-eyed young white female, with an exaggerated hourglass figure. She is dressed in a bright green strapless dress and wears green slippers with white puffs. A trail of pixie dust follows her when she moves.

Davis' first model for the character was 19-year-old Ginni Mack, who had previously been used as the face of the company's Ink and Paint Department for promotional material, and served as a facial expression model. For the character's body, Davis worked at first with Kathryn Beaumont, who had served as his model for Alice. Looking for someone more "adult" who was "sexy" and shapely they turned to Margaret Kerry, who had been named “World’s Most Beautiful Legs” in Hollywood in 1949, and whose experience as a dancer helped convey the character's emotions.

Since 1954, Tinker Bell has featured as a hostess for much of Disney's live-action television programming and in every Disney film advertisements flying over Disneyland with her magic wand and her fairy dust, beginning with Disneyland (which first introduced the theme park to the public while it was still under construction), to Walt Disney Presents, Walt Disney's Wonderful World of Color, and The Wonderful World of Disney. In 1988, she appeared in the final shot of the ending scene of Disney's film Who Framed Roger Rabbit, along with Porky Pig; sprinkling fairy dust on the screen after Porky's trademark farewell as it goes black prior to the closing credits. She also starred alongside other Disney characters, such as Chip 'n Dale, in many Disney comics, where she was also able to speak. Tinker Bell also appears as a healing summon in the Kingdom Hearts series of video games and the card appearance in the video game Mickey's Memory Challenge on 1993.

Tinker Bell is a meetable character at all of the Disney Parks and Resorts, and is based in Fantasyland. She is also featured in Peter Pan's Flight, a suspended dark ride based on the artwork from the animated film. Beginning in 1961, she was featured as a live performer who "flew" suspended from a wire from the top of the Matterhorn Bobsled Ride at the beginning of the nightly fireworks displays. She was played by 70-year-old former circus performer Tiny Kline until her retirement three years later for health reasons. Kline was followed for one summer by Mimi Zerbini, a 19-year-old French circus acrobat, then by Judy Kaye from 1966 to 1977, and by 27-year-old Gina Rock from 1983 to 2005. That was the year the zipline from the Matterhorn became a pulley system that could make the performer go back and forth and up and down.

When the Disney Princess franchise was created in the early 2000s Tinker Bell was also part of the original line-up, but she was soon removed along with Esmeralda as it was decided that they didn't suit the brand.

On the 2008 Walt Disney World Christmas Day Parade special on ABC, Disney announced that a Tinker Bell float would be added to the classic Disney's Electrical Parade at Disney California Adventure Park at the Disneyland Resort, the first new float to be added in decades.

Disney Fairies
Tinker Bell was the central character of the new Disney Fairies franchise, launched in 2005. In addition to an extensive line of merchandise, 2008's Tinker Bell film is the first of six direct-to-DVD features set in Pixie Hollow. In the film, Tinker Bell is a Tinker. Tinker Bell, who speaks in the Fairies universe, unlike her original appearances, is voiced by Mae Whitman in these digitally animated DVD features.

At Disneyland, a Pixie Hollow meet-and-greet area opened on October 28, 2008, near the Matterhorn, where guests are able to interact with Tinker Bell and her companions. A similar area called "Tinker Bell's Magical Nook" is in Fantasyland at Walt Disney World's Magic Kingdom in Florida.

In November 2009, Tinker Bell became the smallest waxwork ever to be made at Madame Tussauds, measuring only five and a half inches.

On September 21, 2010, Tinker Bell was presented with the 2,418th star on the Hollywood Walk of Fame, becoming the thirteenth fictional character  and the fifth Disney character to receive this honor. Tinker Bell's star celebrated Hollywood Walk of Fame's 50th anniversary.

Since 2012's Secret of the Wings, Tinker Bell is the first Disney fairy to have a sibling, a fraternal twin sister named Periwinkle, a frost fairy of the Winter Woods. 

In 2015, it was announced that Disney had begun work on Tink, a live-action film, with Reese Witherspoon playing Tinker Bell and Victoria Strouse writing the script. In 2020, however, the project's status was in question following the casting of Yara Shahidi as Tinker Bell in Peter Pan & Wendy. In 2021, the project re-entered development as a part of Gary Marsh's overall deal with Disney. Witherspoon is still attached to the film as a producer and Maria Melnik (Escape Room) was hired to rewrite the script.

Hook
In the 1991 film Hook, Tinker Bell is portrayed by Julia Roberts. After taking the now-adult Peter to Neverland to rescue his children, Tinker Bell persuades Captain Hook to give her three days to restore Peter's lost memories (including his abilities to fly, fight, and crow) in order to ensure a fair fight between Peter and Hook. After Peter's memory is restored, Tinker Bell "wishes" herself into a human-size woman to share a kiss with Peter. After Peter returns to London, Tinker Bell appears to him one last time on the Peter Pan statue in Kensington Gardens to tell him that she will always love him.

In this version, Tinker Bell is portrayed as a winged, six-inch-tall tomboyish sprite with a red "pixie cut" hairstyle. She wears a ragged leather tunic with matching shorts and carries a dagger strapped to her leg. Only while flying does she appear as the traditional ball of light. Tinker Bell displays strength beyond all proportion to her size and is capable of picking up and carrying a grown man, as well as wielding a human sword while flying (giving the impression that the sword is hovering in mid-air). This is also the first interpretation in which Tinker Bell has the ability to transform into a human-size version of herself. Hook subverts Tinker Bell's canon by having her survive well into the modern era, whereas the original novel states that fairies are naturally short-lived and that Tinker Bell died a year after the Darling children's adventures.

Peter Pan (2003)
In the 2003 film Peter Pan, P.J. Hogan originally planned to use a computer-generated version of the character, but instead used Ludivine Sagnier in combination with digital models and effects to take advantage of the actress's expressions.

Peter Pan & Wendy
Yara Shahidi will be portraying Tinker Bell in the upcoming film Peter Pan & Wendy.

Other literary works

Peter Pan in Scarlet
Tinker Bell returns in the official sequel Peter Pan in Scarlet. When Wendy and the rest of the group reach Neverland and ask Peter where she is, he replies that he does not know anyone by the name Tinker Bell, which is explained as him not remembering her after she died. She is mentioned by Wendy and the rest of the Lost Boys to Fireflyer, a silly blue fairy, who when he reaches the top of Neverpeak, makes the wish to meet her. When they open Captain Hook's treasure chest, among other things, Tinker Bell is seen inside it to Fireflyer's joy. Initially, Tinker Bell does not like him, but eventually she comes to see that Fireflyer is not as bad as he seems to be. In the end, they get married and start selling dreams to the Roamers, previous Lost Boys that have been outcast by Peter, while having many adventures.

Peter and the Starcatchers
In the Dave Barry and Ridley Pearson Peter and the Starcatchers book series, Tinker Bell makes her first appearance at the end of the first novel. Originally, she was a green and yellow coloured bird who was put in a bag of starstuff, turning her into a fairy. Molly's father, the famous starcatcher Lord Leonard Aster, made her Peter's guardian and she follows him on all of his adventures. She doesn't like being called a fairy and would much rather be called "birdwoman" because of her origins. She is very protective of Peter, and hates his paying attention to any other female. She can be very impolite to others (only Peter is able to understand her perfectly, and most of the time he does not reveal what she says about others, because they are mostly insults). She is also able to emit a very bright light, which she uses as an attack against other creatures, especially Lord Ombra, one of the main villains of the series.

Cheshire Crossing
In the Andy Weir and Sarah Andersen Cheshire Crossing series, Tinker "Tink" Bell firstly appears alongside Peter as they attempt to rescue captured fairies from Captain Hook and the Wicked Witch of the West, with Peter being captured and Tink fleeing to get Wendy's help, alongside that of Dorothy Gale and Alice Liddell, providing the latter two with fairy dust to fly. Later, after Dorothy is captured, Tink frees her and goes to Castle West to warn Jack the Knave of Hearts of the incoming flying pirate ship, preventing the Cheshire Cat from eating her when they attempt to do so. Later, after the Witch defeats Mary Poppins in battle, Tink lends Poppins her power against the Witch as Poppins utters "Say hello to my little friend!", leaving them evenly matched. Later, after the Witch has been defeated, Alice places Peter (now shrunken to Tink's size and having matured due to consuming size-altering berries in Wonderland) next to Tink, having recognized her as being in love with him, and after being complimented by Peter as to her appearance, the pair kiss.

On television
Tinker Bell was voiced or portrayed by:
  Sumi Shimamoto in the 1989 anime series The Adventures of Peter Pan.
  Debi Derryberry in the 1990 Fox animated program Peter Pan and the Pirates.
  Keira Knightley in the 2011 Neverland miniseries.
  Rose McIver in season three (2013) of ABC's Once Upon A Time, debuting in the episode "Quite a Common Fairy". 
  In Peter Pan Live!, a TV production of the musical broadcast by NBC in 2014, a computer-generated version of Tinker Bell was used, controlled live by a technician. 
 Paloma Faith in the 2015 Peter & Wendy ITV film.

In World of Winx, Tinker Bell is a powerful fairy from the world of dreams (also called Neverland) and a friend of Peter Pan. When Peter Pan eventually left her for Wendy Darling, she became dark and cold, turning into the evil Queen.

In art
In addition to the illustrations in the original editions of Peter Pan, Tinker Bell has also been depicted by fantasy artists such as Brian Froud and Myrea Pettit. She also appears in the edition of Peter Pan in Scarlet illustrated by David Wyatt.

A bronze sculpture of Tinker Bell by London artist Diarmuid Byron O'Connor was commissioned by Great Ormond Street Hospital, to whom Barrie bequeathed the copyright to the character, to be added to his original four-foot statue of Peter Pan, wresting a thimble from Peter's finger. The figure has a nine-and-a-half-inch wingspan and is seven inches tall, and was unveiled on 29 September 2005 by Sophie, Countess of Wessex.

Tinker Bell in other languages

When translated into other languages, Tinker Bell's name is sometimes rendered more or less phonetically, but is often replaced by a name that evokes her character or one that refers to a bell or represents its sound.

 Arabic — تنة ورنة (Tanna we Ranna)
 Albanian — Tringëllima
 Armenian — Թինկերբել (T’inkerbel)
 Bengali — টিংকার বেল
 Bulgarian — Камбанка (Kambanka)
 Cantonese — 小叮噹 (Xiǎo dīngdāng, "Little Jingle"), 奇妙仙子 (Qímiào xiānzǐ, "Wonderful Fairy")
 Catalan — Campaneta
 Chinese —  奇妙仙子 (Qímiào xiānzǐ)
 Czech — Zvonilka or Zvoněnka
 Danish — Klokkeblomst ("Bellflower")
 Dutch — Rinkelbel and Tinkerbel (in early translations), Tinkelbel (current)
 Finnish — Helinä-keiju ("Ring-a-ling Fairy")
 French — Tinn Tamm (in early translations), Clochette (current)
 Georgian — ტინკერბელი (T’ink’erbeli)
 German — Glöckchen, Glitzerklang, Naseweis, Klingklang
 Greek — Τίνκερ Μπελ (Tínker Bel)
 Gujarati — ટીંકરબેલ (Ṭīṅkarabēla) Hebrew — טינקרבל (Tinkerbell)
 Hindi — टिंकर बेल (Tinkar bel) Hungarian — Giling Galang (in early translations), Csingiling (current)
 Icelandic — Skellibjalla
 Indonesian — Ling Kelinting (Kelinting means "little bell")
 Italian —  Campanellino (in early translations), Trilli (Disney versions)
 Japanese — ティンカー ベル (Tinkā Beru) Korean — 팅커벨 (Tingkeobel) Latvian — Zvārgulīte (Little Sleigh Bell) Lithuanian — Auksarankė (Golden Hands) Macedonian — Ѕвончица (Dzvončica) Marathi — टिंकरबेल (Ṭiṅkarabēla) Mongolian — Тэнүүлч хонх ("Urchin Bell") Nepali — टिंकरबेल (Ṭiṅkarabēla) Norwegian — Tingeling
 Persian — بند انگشتی
 Polish — Blaszany Dzwoneczek, usually shortened to Dzwoneczek ("Tin Tinker") Portuguese — Sininho or Tilim-Tim (Portugal and Brazil in older dubs), Tinker Bell (Brazil)
 Russian — Динь-Динь (Din'-Din') Romanian — Clopoţica
 Serbo-Croatian — Звончица/Zvončica (Bells) Slovak — Cililing
 Slovenian — Zvončica
 Swedish — Tingeling
 Spanish — Campanilla (Spain), Campanita (Hispanic America), Tinker Bell (Latin America)
 Taiwanese — 奇妙仙子-叮叮
 Tamil — டிங்கர் பெல் (Ṭiṅkar pel) Thai — ทิงเกอร์เบลล์ (Thingkoebeo) Turkish — Çan Çiçeği (Bellflower) Ukrainian — Дінь-Дінь (Din'-Din')''

References

External links

 Disney's character profile of Tinker Bell
 Discovering the Magic Kingdom: An Unofficial Disneyland Vacation Guide - Second Edition
 Gina Rock: The Longest Flying Tinker Bell In Disneyland History

Theatre characters introduced in 1904
Corporate mascots
Female characters in animation
Female characters in film
Female characters in literature
Female characters in television
Female characters in advertising
Fictional fairies and sprites
Film sidekicks
Film studio mascots
Peter Pan characters
Sidekicks in literature